Micronauts was a toy line manufactured and marketed by Mego Corporation from 1976 to 1980.

Micronauts, The Micronauts or Micronaut may also refer to:
 Micronauts (comics), based on the toy line
 Micronauts (TV series), an unproduced animated series based on the toy line
 The Micronauts, a French dance music act
 The Micronauts, a series of unrelated novels by Gordon Williams
 The Micronauts, an unmade film that film producer Harry Saltzman struggled to make throughout the 1970s
 Micronaut, a side project by musician Chris Randall
 Micronaut (framework), a microservices application framework for the Java software platform